Alec Cannon was an English footballer who played in the Football League for Wolverhampton Wanderers.

Cannon was a reliable wing–half, who deputised for both Albert Fletcher and Arthur Lowder during his two seasons with Wolverhampton Wanderers.

Early career
In his early career he played for Cannock Royal and Easington White Rose and joined Wolverhampton Wanderers in 1887.

Season 1888–89
Alec Cannon, playing as a winger, made his League debut on 8 September 1888, at Dudley Road, the then home of Wolverhampton Wanderers. The  visitors were Aston Villa and the match ended as a 1–1 draw. Alec Cannon appeared in seven of the 22 League matches played by Wolverhampton Wanderers in season 1888–89 and as a winger/wing–half (seven appearances) was part of a midfield that achieved a big (three-League-goals-or-more) win on two occasions.

1889 onwards
Alec Cannon left Wolverhampton Wanderers in 1889 and joined Kidderminster Harriers or Kidderminster Olympic. Note: ENFA say Olympic and Matthews says Harriers. These clubs were great rivals and finished as Birmingham and District League Champions (Olympic) and runners–up (Harriers) in season 1889–90. Cannon later went on to assist Springhill Athletic. There appear to be no records for this club. Cannon retired in 1901.

References

 (registration & fee required)

Year of birth unknown
Date of death unknown
English footballers
Wolverhampton Wanderers F.C. players
English Football League players
Association football midfielders